John Caven may refer to:

John Caven (American politician) (1824–1905), Indiana politician and Freemason
John Caven (Canadian politician) (born c. 1838), Ontario farmer and political figure
John Caven (footballer) (born 1934), Scottish footballer